Istanbul Buz Korsanları SK is a Turkish women's ice hockey team in Avcılar, Istanbul, Turkey playing in the Turkish Ice Hockey Women's League (TBHBL). The club was founded in 2009.

Team roster
As of 2015–16 season.

Legend
G: Goaltender
D: Defenseman
F: Forward
C: Captain

Honours
 Turkish Women's First League
 Champion (1): 2015–16.

References

Sport in Istanbul
Turkish Ice Hockey Women's League teams
Avcılar, Istanbul
Ice hockey clubs established in 2009
2009 establishments in Turkey